New Moradabad is a township in Moradabad district, Uttar Pradesh, India, developed by the Moradabad Development Authority. The township is spread on more than 800 acres of land.

See also
 Civil Lines, Moradabad

References

Neighbourhoods in Moradabad